In mathematics, low-rank approximation is a minimization problem, in which the cost function measures the fit between a given matrix (the data) and an approximating matrix (the optimization variable), subject to a constraint that the approximating matrix has reduced rank. The problem is used for mathematical modeling and data compression. The rank constraint is related to a constraint on the complexity of a model that fits the data. In applications, often there are other constraints on the approximating matrix apart from the rank constraint, e.g., non-negativity and Hankel structure.

Low-rank approximation is closely related to:

 principal component analysis,
 factor analysis,
 total least squares,
 latent semantic analysis
 orthogonal regression, and
 dynamic mode decomposition.

Definition 

Given

 structure specification ,
 vector of structure parameters , 
 norm , and
 desired rank ,

Applications 

 Linear system identification, in which case the approximating matrix is Hankel structured.
 Machine learning, in which case the approximating matrix is nonlinearly structured.
 Recommender systems, in which cases the data matrix has missing values and the approximation is categorical.
 Distance matrix completion, in which case there is a positive definiteness constraint.
 Natural language processing, in which case the approximation is nonnegative.
 Computer algebra, in which case the approximation is Sylvester structured.

Basic low-rank approximation problem 

The unstructured problem with fit measured by the Frobenius norm, i.e., 

has analytic solution in terms of the singular value decomposition of the data matrix. The result is referred to as the matrix approximation lemma or Eckart–Young–Mirsky theorem. This problem was originally solved by Erhard Schmidt in the infinite dimensional context of integral operators (although his methods easily generalize to arbitrary compact operators on Hilbert spaces) and later rediscovered by C. Eckart and G. Young. L. Mirsky generalized the result to arbitrary unitarily invariant norms. Let

Then the rank- matrix, obtained from the truncated singular value decomposition

is such that

The minimizer  is unique if and only if .

Proof of Eckart–Young–Mirsky theorem (for spectral norm) 
Suppose that 

 

First, note that we have

 

Therefore, we need to show that if  where  and  have  columns then .

 

such that . Without loss of generality, we can scale  so that  or (equivalently) . Therefore,

 

The result follows by taking the square root of both sides of the above inequality.

Proof of Eckart–Young–Mirsky theorem (for Frobenius norm) 

Suppose that

 

First, note that we have

 

Therefore, we need to show that if  where  and  have  columns then

 

By the triangle inequality with the spectral norm, if  then . Then, for any 

 

Since , when  and  we conclude that for 

 

Therefore,

 

as required.

Weighted low-rank approximation problems 

The Frobenius norm weights uniformly all elements of the approximation error  . Prior knowledge about distribution of the errors can be taken into account by considering the weighted low-rank approximation problem

The general weighted low-rank approximation problem does not admit an analytic solution in terms of the singular value decomposition and is solved by local optimization methods, which provide no guarantee that a globally optimal solution is found.

In case of uncorrelated weights, weighted low-rank approximation problem also can be formulated in this way: for a non-negative matrix  and a matrix  we want to minimize  over matrices, of rank at most .

Entry-wise Lp low-rank approximation problems 
Let . For , the fastest algorithm runs in  time. One of the important ideas been used is called Oblivious Subspace Embedding (OSE), it is first proposed by Sarlos.

For , it is known that this entry-wise L1 norm is more robust than the Frobenius norm in the presence of outliers and is indicated in models where Gaussian assumptions on the noise may not apply. It is natural to seek to minimize .

Distance low-rank approximation problem 
Let  and  be two point sets in an arbitrary metric space. Let  represent the  matrix where . Such distances matrices are commonly computed in software packages and have applications to learning image manifolds, handwriting recognition, and multi-dimensional unfolding. In an attempt to reduce their description size, one can study low rank approximation of such matrices.

Distributed/Streaming low-rank approximation problem 

The low-rank approximation problems in the distributed and streaming setting has been considered in.

Image and kernel representations of the rank constraints 

Using the equivalences

and

the weighted low-rank approximation problem becomes equivalent to the parameter optimization problems

and

where  is the identity matrix of size .

Alternating projections algorithm 

The image representation of the rank constraint suggests a parameter optimization method in which the cost function is minimized alternatively over one of the variables ( or ) with the other one fixed.

The resulting optimization algorithm (called alternating projections) is globally convergent with a linear convergence rate to a locally optimal solution of the weighted low-rank approximation problem. The iteration is stopped when a user defined convergence condition is satisfied.

Matlab implementation of the alternating projections algorithm for weighted low-rank approximation:

function [dh, f] = wlra_ap(d, w, p, tol, maxiter)
[m, n] = size(d); r = size(p, 2); f = inf;
for i = 2:maxiter
    % minimization over L
    bp = kron(eye(n), p);
    vl = (bp' * w * bp) \ bp' * w * d(:);
    l  = reshape(vl, r, n);
    % minimization over P
    bl = kron(l', eye(m));
    vp = (bl' * w * bl) \ bl' * w * d(:);
    p  = reshape(vp, m, r);
    % check exit condition
    dh = p * l; dd = d - dh;
    f(i) = dd(:)' * w * dd(:);
    if abs(f(i - 1) - f(i)) < tol, break, end
endfor

Variable projections algorithm 

The bilinear nature of the problem is effectively used in an alternative approach, called variable projections.

Consider again the weighted low rank approximation problem, parameterized in the image form. Minimization with respect to the  variable (a linear least squares problem) leads to the closed form expression of the approximation error as a function of 
 
For this purpose standard optimization methods, e.g. the Levenberg-Marquardt algorithm can be used.

Matlab implementation of the variable projections algorithm for weighted low-rank approximation:

function [dh, f] = wlra_varpro(d, w, p, tol, maxiter)
prob = optimset(); prob.solver = 'lsqnonlin';
prob.options = optimset('MaxIter', maxiter, 'TolFun', tol); 
prob.x0 = p; prob.objective = @(p) cost_fun(p, d, w);
[p, f ] = lsqnonlin(prob); 
[f, vl] = cost_fun(p, d, w); 
dh = p * reshape(vl, size(p, 2), size(d, 2));

function [f, vl] = cost_fun(p, d, w)
bp = kron(eye(size(d, 2)), p);
vl = (bp' * w * bp) \ bp' * w * d(:);
f = d(:)' * w * (d(:) - bp * vl);
 
The variable projections approach can be applied also to low rank approximation problems parameterized in the kernel form. The method is effective when the number of eliminated variables is much larger than the number of optimization variables left at the stage of the nonlinear least squares minimization. Such problems occur in system identification, parameterized in the kernel form, where the eliminated variables are the approximating trajectory and the remaining variables are the model parameters. In the context of linear time-invariant systems, the elimination step is equivalent to Kalman smoothing.

A Variant: convex-restricted low rank approximation
Usually, we want our new solution not only to be of low rank, but also satisfy other convex constraints due to application requirements. Our interested problem would be as follows,

 

This problem has many real world applications, including to recover a good solution from an inexact (semidefinite programming) relaxation. If additional constraint  is linear, like we require all elements to be nonnegative, the problem is called structured low rank approximation. The more general form is named convex-restricted low rank approximation.

This problem is helpful in solving many problems. However, it is challenging due to the combination of the convex and nonconvex (low-rank) constraints. However, the Alternating Direction Method of Multipliers (ADMM) can be applied to solve the nonconvex problem with convex objective function, rank constraints and other convex constraints, and is thus suitable to solve our above problem. Moreover, unlike the general nonconvex problems, ADMM will guarantee to converge a feasible solution as long as its dual variable converges in the iterations.

See also
 CUR matrix approximation is made from the rows and columns of the original matrix

References

 M. T. Chu, R. E. Funderlic, R. J. Plemmons, Structured low-rank approximation, Linear Algebra and its Applications, Volume 366, 1 June 2003, Pages 157–172

External links
C++ package for structured-low rank approximation

Numerical linear algebra
Dimension reduction
Mathematical optimization